Jordan Pothain (born 14 October 1994) is a French swimmer.

He competes at the 2016 Summer Olympics in Rio de Janeiro where he qualifies to the final of the 400m freestyle, finishing 8th.

References

1994 births
Living people
People from Échirolles
French male freestyle swimmers
Olympic swimmers of France
Swimmers at the 2016 Summer Olympics
Medalists at the FINA World Swimming Championships (25 m)
Sportspeople from Isère
Swimmers at the 2020 Summer Olympics